This article provides information on candidates who stood for the 1913 Australian federal election. The election was held on 31 May 1913.

By-elections, appointments and defections

By-elections and appointments
On 24 August 1910, Sir Robert Best (Liberal) was elected to replace William Knox (Liberal) as the member for Kooyong.
On 8 February 1911, Frank Brennan (Labour) was elected to replace Henry Beard (Labour) as the member for Batman.
On 11 March 1911, Granville Ryrie (Liberal) was elected to replace George Edwards (Liberal) as the member for North Sydney.
On 11 November 1911, David Gordon (Liberal) was elected to replace Lee Batchelor (Labour) as the member for Boothby.
On 1 June 1912, Benjamin Bennett (Labor) was elected to replace David Hall (Labor) as the member for Werriwa.
On 31 July 1912, John Shannon (Liberal) was appointed as a South Australian Senator to replace William Russell (Labor).

Defections
 Liberal Senator Cyril Cameron (Tasmania) lost pre-selection and contested the election as an Independent.

Redistributions and seat changes
Redistributions of electoral boundaries occurred in New South Wales, Victoria, Queensland and Western Australia.
In New South Wales, no seats were created or abolished. The Liberal-held seat of Illawarra became notionally Labor, while the Labor-held seats of Nepean and Robertson became notionally Liberal.
In Victoria, Laanecoorie and Mernda (both Liberal-held) were abolished and Henty (notionally Liberal) was created. The Liberal-held seats of Fawkner and Grampians became notionally Labor.
The member for Laanecoorie, Carty Salmon (Liberal), contested the Senate.
In Queensland, the seat of Lilley (notionally Liberal) was created.
In Western Australia, Coolgardie was renamed Dampier.
The member for Coolgardie, Hugh Mahon (Labor), contested Dampier.

Retiring Members and Senators

Labor
 Benjamin Bennett MP (Werriwa, NSW)

Liberal
 Alfred Deakin MP (Ballaarat, Vic)
 Richard Edwards MP (Oxley, Qld)
 Robert Harper MP (Mernda, Vic)
Senator Simon Fraser (Vic)
Senator James Walker (NSW)

House of Representatives
Sitting members at the time of the election are shown in bold text.
Successful candidates are highlighted in the relevant colour. Where there is possible confusion, an asterisk (*) is also used.

New South Wales

Queensland

South Australia

Tasmania

Victoria

Western Australia

Senate
Sitting senators are shown in bold text. Tickets that elected at least one Senator are highlighted in the relevant colour. Successful candidates are identified by an asterisk (*).

New South Wales
Three seats were up for election. The Liberal Party was defending three seats. Labor Senators Albert Gardiner, Allan McDougall and Arthur Rae were not up for re-election.

Queensland
Three seats were up for election. The Liberal Party was defending three seats. Labor Senators Thomas Givens, James Stewart and Harry Turley were not up for re-election.

South Australia

Three seats were up for election. The Liberal Party was defending three seats. Labor Senators Robert Guthrie, Gregor McGregor and William Story were not up for re-election.

Tasmania

Three seats were up for election. The Liberal Party was defending three seats. Labor Senators James Long, David O'Keefe and Rudolph Ready were not up for re-election.

Victoria

Three seats were up for election. The Liberal Party was defending two seats. The Labor Party was defending one seat. Labor Senators Stephen Barker, Albert Blakey and Edward Findley were not up for re-election.

Western Australia

Three seats were up for election. The Labor Party was defending three seats. Labor Senators Richard Buzacott, Hugh de Largie and George Henderson were not up for re-election.

See also
 1913 Australian federal election
 Members of the Australian House of Representatives, 1910–1913
 Members of the Australian House of Representatives, 1913–1914
 Members of the Australian Senate, 1910–1913
 Members of the Australian Senate, 1913–1914
 List of political parties in Australia

References
Adam Carr's Election Archive - House of Representatives 1913
Adam Carr's Election Archive - Senate 1913

1913 in Australia
Candidates for Australian federal elections